Suka Makmue is a town in Aceh province of Indonesia and it is the seat (capital) of Nagan Raya Regency.

Populated places in Aceh
Regency seats of Aceh